Stephen Decatur Miller (May 8, 1787March 8, 1838) was an American politician, who served as the 52nd Governor of South Carolina from 1828 to 1830. He represented South Carolina as a U.S. Representative from 1817 to 1819, and as a U.S. Senator from 1831 to 1833.

Life and career
He was born in Waxhaw settlement, South Carolina and graduated from South Carolina College in 1808. After he studied law, he practiced in Sumterville.
Stephen Decatur Miller was married twice. His first wife, Elizabeth Dick, died in 1819. None of their three children lived to adulthood. Miller remarried in 1821; his second wife was a girl sixteen years his junior, Mary Boykin (1804−1885). They had four children together. Despite the age difference, their marriage was happy and passionate.

During his successful campaign for the Senate on a platform of abolishing tariffs, he made a speech at Stateburg, South Carolina in September 1830 where he said, "There are three and only three ways, to reform our congressional legislation. The representative, judicial and belligerent principle alone can be relied on; or as they are more familiarly called, the ballot box, the jury box and the cartouche box."
Stephen Miller renounced his political career in 1833 and ventured into farming in Mississippi. He died in Raymond, Mississippi, in 1838, leaving his wife and children in debt.

Their daughter Mary Boykin Miller (1823–86) married James Chesnut, Jr. (1815–85), who later became a U.S. Senator and a Confederate general. Mary Chesnut became famous for her diary documenting life in South Carolina during the Civil War.

Notes

References
Muhlenfeld, Elisabeth, Mary Boykin Chesnut: A Biography (Baton Rouge: Louisiana State University Press 1992).

External links
SCIway Biography of Stephen Decatur Miller
NGA Biography of Stephen Decatur Miller

1787 births
1838 deaths
University of South Carolina alumni
South Carolina lawyers
Democratic Party South Carolina state senators
Democratic Party governors of South Carolina
University of South Carolina trustees
United States senators from South Carolina
High Hills of Santee
Nullifier Party politicians
Nullifier Party United States senators
Democratic-Republican Party members of the United States House of Representatives from South Carolina
Nullifier Party state governors of the United States
19th-century American politicians
19th-century American lawyers